Cerium(III) sulfate, also called cerous sulfate, is an inorganic compound with the formula Ce2(SO4)3.  It is one of the few salts whose solubility in water decreases with rising temperature. 

Cerium (III) sulfate (anhydrous) is a hygroscopic white solid, which begins to decompose above 600°C. It has a monoclinic crystal structure.

Cerium (III) sulfate tetrahydrate is a white solid that releases its water of crystallisation at 220 °C. It has (like the white octahydrate) a monoclinic crystal structure with the space group P21/c (space group 14).  The nonahydrate has a hexagonal crystal structure with the space group P63/m (space group 176). Hydrates of this compound are known with 12, 9, 8, 5, 4 and 2 parts of water of crystallisation.

References

See also 

 Cerium(IV) sulfate
 Cerium(III) nitrate

Cerium(III) compounds
Sulfates